Neuronal pentraxin receptor is a protein that in humans is encoded by the NPTXR gene.

This gene encodes a protein similar to the rat neuronal pentraxin receptor. The rat protein pentraxin is thought to mediate neuronal uptake of synaptic material and the presynaptic snake venom toxin, taipoxin. Studies in rat indicate that translation of this mRNA initiates at a non-AUG (CUG) codon. This may also be true for human and mouse, based on strong sequence conservation amongst these species.

See also
NPTX2, Neuronal pentraxin II

References

Further reading